Shootdown is a 1988 American made-for-television drama film starring Angela Lansbury. Leonard Hill served as the executive producer.

Plot
In the film, Nan Moore (Lansbury) loses her son in the Korean Air Lines Flight 007 disaster. She wishes to discover the truth about her son's death.

Cast
Angela Lansbury as Nan Moore
George Coe as David
Kyle Secor as John Moore
Molly Hagan as Elizabeth Moore
Jennifer Savidge as Mary
Diana Bellamy as Lillian
Alan Fudge as Bruce

Production
The film's production was delayed due to controversies surrounding the KAL007 incident. NBC subjected the film to various cuts and rewrites. Producer Leonard Hill said that NBC's censors "played the role of grand inquisitor. It was quite a relentless interrogation and it turned into a war of attrition." The network deleted dialogue that criticized the U.S. government for using the incident for its own political purposes, and specific criticisms of the Reagan administration were likewise repressed. Consequently, the film made no mention of the U.S. Air Force destroying all radar tapes after the incident, nor that the Korea pilot Captain Chun took out a grand sum of insurance the night before the flight. The network also insisted that Seymour Hersh's view that the aeroplane had simply drifted into Soviet airspace be inserted into the film.

See also
Coded Hostile

References

External links

1988 television films
1988 films
1988 drama films
American drama television films
American aviation films
NBC network original films
Films directed by Michael Pressman
Films scored by Craig Safan
1980s American films